2006 in professional wrestling describes the year's events in the world of professional wrestling.

List of notable promotions 
These promotions held notable shows in 2006.

Calendar of notable shows

January

February

March

April

May

June

July

August

September

October

November

December

Accomplishments and tournaments

AAA

TNA

TNA Year End Awards

WWE

WWE Hall of Fame

Awards and honors

Pro Wrestling Illustrated

Wrestling Observer Newsletter

Wrestling Observer Newsletter Hall of Fame

Wrestling Observer Newsletter awards

Title changes

NJPW

TNA

WWE 
 – Raw
 – SmackDown!
 - ECW

Raw and SmackDown each had a world championship, a secondary championship, and a tag team championship for male wrestlers. ECW only had a world championship. SmackDown also had a title for their cruiserweight wrestlers. There was only one women's championship and it was exclusive to Raw.

Debuts

 January 6 – Mike Bailey
 February 24 – Kofi Kingston
 March 4 – Tomomitsu Matsunaga
 April 7 – Vladimir Kozlov
 May 27 – Tetsuya Naito
 June – Cody Rhodes
 June 13 – Kelly Kelly
 June 18 – Yusuke Kubo
 July 1 – Victoria Crawford
 July 16 – Hanako Nakamori
 July 17 – Kaji Tomato 
 August 8 – Gota Ihashi
 August 16 – Layla El
 August 24 – Maryse
 November
 Rosa Mendes
 Brooke/Miss Tessmacher

Retirements

 Ivory (1986–2006)
 Lex Luger (1985-2006)
 Mo (1991–2006) (first retirement, returned in 2014) 
 Marc Mero (1990-2006) 
 Mikey Batts (June 20, 2003 - June 14, 2006)
 Sean O'Haire (June 26, 2000 – June 28, 2006)
 Stacy Keibler (1999 – July 2006)
 Jackie Fargo (1950-September 16, 2006)
 Luther Reigns (1997 -September 16, 2006)
 Trish Stratus (March 19, 2000 – September 17, 2006) (brief return in 2011, 2018, Evolution and 2019)
 Lita (1999 – November 26, 2006) (occasional wrestler)

Births
 December 28: 
Hina
Rina

Deaths 
 January 15 - Ricky Romero, 74
 January 16 – El Texano, 47
 January 28 – Black Cat, 51
 January 28 – Emory Hale, 36
 February 11 - Jackie Pallo, 80
 February 16 - Johnny Grunge, 39
 March 14 - Marie Lograsso, 42/43 
 April 2 - Víctor Quiñones, 46 
 April 27 - Kay Noble, 65
 May 2 - Sam Steamboat, 71
 May 26 - Grigory Verichev, 49
 May 27 – Apache Bull Ramos, 68
 June 7 – Earthquake, 42 
 June 23 - Luke Graham, 66
 June 25 - Harry Elliott, 101 
 July 16 – Bob Orton, 76
 September 15 - Ricky Gibson, 53 
 October 5 – Antonio Peña, 55
 October 15 - Joey Maggs, 39 
 October 26 - Kintaro Ohki, 77
 October 28 - Trevor Berbick, 52 
 October 31 - Huracán Ramírez, 80
 November 3 - Sputnik Monroe, 77
 November 13 - Tiger Conway Sr., 74 
 December 16 – Don Jardine, 66

See also
List of TNA pay-per-view events
List of WWE pay-per-view events

References

 
professional wrestling